The Green Man is a grade II listed public house in Mill Green Lane, Hatfield, Hertfordshire, England. The building is based on a seventeenth-century timber frame with later additions.

References

External links

Pubs in Welwyn Hatfield (district)
Grade II listed pubs in Hertfordshire
Hatfield, Hertfordshire
Timber framed buildings in Hertfordshire